Kamalanga Thermal Power Plant is a coal based thermal power project located at Kamalanga in Dhenkanal district in Indian state of Odisha. The power plant is one of the coal based power plants of GMR Kamalanga Energy Limited, a subsidiary of GMR Group.

Coal for the power plant is sourced from  Mahanadi Coalfields Limited.

Capacity
Its planned capacity is 1050 MW (3x350 MW). There is plan to add another unit of 350 MW in second phase of the power plant.

References

Coal-fired power stations in Odisha
Dhenkanal district
2013 establishments in Odisha
Energy infrastructure completed in 2013